The Deep Creek is a watercourse of the Port Phillip catchment, located in the outer north western suburbs of Melbourne, in the Australian state of Victoria.

Location and features
Formed by the confluence of a number of smaller streams draining the north eastern slopes of the Macedon Ranges and the southern slopes of the Cobaw range, both ranges being constituent parts of the Great Dividing Range, the Deep Creek rises north of Mount Macedon, near Cobaw. The Deep Creek reaches its confluence with the Jackson Creek near Bulla and together they form the Maribyrnong River. The deep and relatively narrow valley cut by the creek in its southward course through the surrounding basalt plains is particularly prominent at such localities as Darraweit Guim,  and Bulla.

Unregulated by major dams or diversions, the water levels in the creek show great seasonal variation. Recently, Deep Creek flowed only seasonally along most of its length, although significant pools and stretches of water remain all year, some of which are local swimming holes.

Etymology
The creek was originally considered to be the extension of the Maribyrnong River, and as such has also been known as Saltwater River (an original name for the Maribyrnong River) or alternatively the Upper Maribyrnong River, Maribyrnong Creek, Maribyrnong River East Branch or Maribyrnong River Left Branch. Another possible name for the river is Darraweit Guim, also the name of a small town located on the river. The name Deep Creek may refer to the deep valley the watercourse has cut through the plains north of Melbourne or the deep pools which have formed in the riverbed.

Geography
The named tributaries of the river, ordered upstream, are:

 Jacksons Creek
 Emu Creek
 Konagaderra Creek
 Boyd Creek
 Five Mile Creek
 Long Gully Creek
 Dry Creek
 Monument Creek
 Garden Hut Creek

Crossings
Named bridges and other significant crossing points along Deep Creek, ordered upstream, include but are not limited to:

 Bulla Bridge (current triple arch bluestone bridge built 1869, replacing an earlier timber bridge)
 Wildwood Rd
 Konagaderra Rd
 McCabes Bridge (Stockdale Rd)
 Darraweit Valley Rd
 Chintin Rd
 Gallaghers Ford (Joyces Rd)
 Dalys Bridge (Woodend – Wallan Rd)
 Sheehans Crossing bridge (Sheehans Rd)
 Forbes Bridge (Forbes Rd)
 Doggetts Bridge (Lancefield – Kilmore Rd)
 Musteys Bridge (Lancefield – Tooborac Rd)
 Linehans Bridge (Baynton Rd) (replaced by a low-level causeway during the 1990s, the old bridge is closed and derelict)
 Twin  Bridges (Kyneton – Lancefield Rd)
 White Bridge (Whitebridge Rd)

See also 

 List of rivers in Australia

References

External links

Melbourne Water catchment
Rivers of Greater Melbourne (region)
Rivers of Hume (region)
Rivers of Loddon Mallee (region)
Tributaries of the Maribyrnong River
City of Hume